Penina Fololisi Masila (born circa 1967) is a Tongan former rugby union player who played as hooker.

Career
Masila's first international cap for Tonga was on 8 April 1990, against Japan at Chichibunomiya Rugby Stadium, Tokyo. He was also part of the Tonga squad for the 1995 Rugby World Cup, where he only played in the match against France in Pretoria, on 26 May 1995. His last cap for Tonga was against Australia in Canberra, on 22 September 1998.

References

External links
Fololisi Masila statistics on ESPN Scrum

Living people
Tongan rugby union players
Tonga international rugby union players
Rugby union hookers
1967 births